The Tunisian Women's Division I Basketball League is the highest women's professional club basketball competition in Tunisia.
The competition was created in 1956 Just after the Independence of Tunisia Ruled and managed by the Tunisian Basketball Federation, and since it was held every single year until Nowadays, Except only in 1958 season that was cancelled, however the dominant Club is CS Sfaxien from Sfax with a total of 19 titles as a record followed by Zitouna Sports From Tunis with 8 titles, and third rank we find Stade Tunisien also from Tunis with 8 Titles.

Winners list

Titles by club

References

External links
Basketball Tunisia 
Profile at eurobasket.com

Basketball competitions in Tunisia
Women's basketball leagues in Africa
1956 establishments in Tunisia
Sports leagues established in 1956
Women's sport in Tunisia